
Gmina Udanin is a rural gmina (administrative district) in Środa Śląska County, Lower Silesian Voivodeship, in south-western Poland.

It is part of the larger Wrocław metropolitan area.

Neighbouring gminas
Gmina Udanin is bordered by the gminas of Kostomłoty, Mściwojów, Środa Śląska, Strzegom, Wądroże Wielkie and Żarów.

Villages
The gmina contains the villages of Damianowo, Dębki, Dębnica, Drogomiłowice, Dziwigórz, Gościsław, Jańczów, Jarosław, Jarostów, Karnice, Konary, Księżyce, Łagiewniki Średzkie, Lasek, Lusina, Pichorowice, Piekary, Pielaszkowice, Różana, Sokolniki, Udanin, Ujazd Dolny and Ujazd Górny.

Twin towns – sister cities

Gmina Udanin is twinned with:
 Oderwitz, Germany

References

Udanin
Środa Śląska County